Mary Knisely (born Schilly; May 29, 1959) is a retired middle- and long-distance runner from the United States. She set her personal best (8:42.84) in the women's 3000-meter run on 13 July 1987 at a meet in Nice. Knisely is a two-time US national champion in the 3000 m (1986 and 1987), and was the marathon national champion in 2001. She competed as a student at Concord High School.

In 2008, the Delaware Sports Museum and Hall of Fame inducted Knisely.

She competed at the U.S. Olympic Trials three times, was a gold medalist in the 3000 meters at the 1987 Pan American Games, silver medalist in the IAAF World Cup 10,000 m, and was a member of the 1985 and 1987 gold medal winning U.S. teams at the IAAF World Cross Country Championships. She placed third in the 3000 m at the 1986 IAAF Grand Prix Final and second in the 5000 m at the 1987 IAAF Grand Prix Final.

She holds personal records of: 2:02 min (800 m) 4:05 (1500 m), 8:41 (3000 m), 15:12 (5000 m), 32:19 (10,000 m), and 2:35:11 (marathon).

References
trackfield.brinkster

1959 births
Living people
Sportspeople from Wilmington, Delaware
Track and field athletes from Delaware
American female middle-distance runners
American female long-distance runners
American female cross country runners
Pan American Games track and field athletes for the United States
Pan American Games gold medalists for the United States
Pan American Games medalists in athletics (track and field)
Athletes (track and field) at the 1987 Pan American Games
Medalists at the 1987 Pan American Games